Arkadikos B.C., or S.E.F.A. Arkadikos B.C. (Greek: Αρκαδικός ΚΑΕ), is a Greek professional basketball club that is based in Tripoli, Greece.

History
Arkadikos' basketball section was founded in 1976, under the name S.E.F.A. Arkadikos. During the 2007–08 season, Arkadikos managed to achieve the first place and qualify to the Greek 3rd Division.

In 2010, the club Arkadikos competed in the Greek Second Division for the first time. In the club's first season in the Greek 2nd Division, Arkadikos managed to finish in fourth place in the Greek Second Division.

In 2015, Arkadikos finished second in the Greek 2nd Division, thus earning promotion to the Greek Basket League for the 2015–16 season.

Arenas
Arkadikos play their home games at the 1,000 seat Tripoli Indoor Hall.

Season by season results

Roster

Notable players

  Nikos Chatzis
  Ioannis Karamalegkos
  Akis Kallinikidis
  Sakis Karidas
  Petros Noeas
  Andronikos Gizogiannis
  Sokrates Gizogiannis
  Dimitrios Karadolamis
  Dimitrios Katiakos
  Alexandros Sigounas
  Georgios Galiotos
  Fotios Lampropoulos
  Vassilis Kavvadas
  Kostas Ezomo
  /  Miloš Šakota
  Matti Nuutinen
  Stefan Đorđević
  /  Ivan Mišković
  Devon van Oostrum
 Steve Leven
  Askia Booker
  Cameron Jones
  Alex Legion
  Travele Jones

Head coaches
  Ioannis Kastritis

References

External links
Official site 
Eurobasket.com Team profile
Roster

Tripoli, Greece
Sport in Arcadia, Peloponnese
Basketball teams established in 1976
Basketball teams in Greece